István Horkay (born December 25, 1945, in Budapest) is a Hungarian   painter,  printmaker, digital artist, member of the  HEAA

After graduating from the School of Fine Arts in Budapest in 1964, Horkay was invited to attend the Academy of Fine Arts in Cracow -Poland, one of the Major Art and Cultural Centers of Eastern Europe, where he received his Master of Fine Arts. He continued his Studies at the Royal Academy of Art in Copenhagen, Denmark. (1968) and did additional Post graduate work at the Academy of Fine Arts in Budapest. (1971) Horkay studied under the Internationally known Artist and Theater Director Tadeusz Kantor as well as Professors M. Wejman, J. Nowosielski, and Palle Nielsen, Danmark. He received Diplomas in Graphic Arts, Painting, and Film Animation.
He is member of the Alliance Graphique International (AGI), Hungarian Electrographic Art Association.

Horkay's art is epitomic in the double meaning of the word: a fragment, an incised part of something already in existence, and - just because of this incision - is an injury to the finished surface, to the tangle of writing or a finished picture. This relies on the experience that man, handing himself down through signs, simulates a kind of sense-wholeness. In these series this textual sense-wholeness appears to be ever different as different colors enter the surface at different sites. It is the same and not the same at the same time. "Once the signs are scars, then the wounds will tell tales of some non-alleviated history" (D. Kamper - Zur Soziologie der Imagination Hanser V. 1986. p. 148).

The sign will temporarily closen over the story. Who else would know this better than Freud, who, after the neurological-physiological and neuropsychical phases, so deeply doubted that it was possible "to bring to light the hidden content in its wholeness"

(Konstruktionen in der Analyse 1937. in: Stud. Ausgabe Ergb. Fischer V. 1982. p. 398).

Béla Bacsó

Exhibitions

2002 American Fine Art Editions Inc/Scottsdale
2002 Magyar Intézet, Moszkva 
2002 Gallery of Art Eastern Washington University
2002 Kamiyamada /Japan/
2003 Leslie Sacks Fine Art Los Angeles/Web Exhibition/
2003 Collegium Hungaricum/Berlin/
2003 American Fine Art Editions Inc/Scottsdale
2003 LeVall Art Gallery Novosibirsk/ Russia
2004 Gutman Galery Budapest
2004 GGalery Budapest
2004 Peter Greenaway /Tulse Luper Film There
2004 Canariasmediafest
2004 Ausztralia IDAA
2004 Academy Gallery University of Tasmania
2004 QUT Art Museum Brisbane,
2004 VCA Gallery Australia
2004 Montreal Festival of New Cinema
2005 Belgrade/Closed Circuits/
2005 VCA Gallery University of Melbourne
2005 QUT Art Museum BRISBANE
2005 Beijing Today Art Museum
2006 Beijing Film Academy
2006 New Delhi India CEC+CAC
2006 QUT Art Museum Australia
2007 Metro5 Gallery Australia
2009 Jewish Museum of Australia
2009 Collegium Hungaricum  Berlin
2009 Gallery art6 Richmond/ Virginia
2009  QACI Gallery, Queensland/ Australia
2010  Corona d'alloro alla carriera artistica Europclub Regione Siciliana (Italia) con Ennio Morricone, Giovamna Mulas
2011 Ballarat International Foto Biennale/Australia
2012 Vision in Motion/Melbourne Australia
2012 Vision in Motion II./ Roma/ Sapienza - Università di Roma/  Accademia d'Ungheria in Roma
2012 The One Thing / Manning Clark House/ Canberra /Australia
2012 The Little Mermaid /  ANU Art Gallery /Canberra/Australia
2013 Accademia d'Ungheria in Roma
2013 Ballarat International Foto Biennale/Australia
2013 A Virtual Memorial Vilnius
2014 Brenda May Gallery Sydney Australia/Head On Photo Festival
2014 Roma/Ara Pacis Museum/ MashRome Film Fest
2014 Salone delle Bandiere del Comune di Messina
2014 Shanghai Teyou Culture Communication Co/China
2015  Li AN Cultural development Co Shanghai / China
2016 Léna Roselli Galéria Budapest
2016 MANK Galéria Szentendre
2016 Shenzhen OCT Loft- Manufacturing culture space / China
2017 Accademia di Belle Arti  - Sassari /Sardegna
2018 Warsaw International Poster Biennale
2019  Accademia di Belle Arti/Cyberzone/Palermo/Sicily
2019  KAFF Kecskemét
2019 Pradita Institute/Singapore/Jakarta/Indonesia

References

External links
Vimeo
Museum Factory - Horkay's website
 The Little Marmaid work with Peter Greenaway
 Posters

1945 births
Living people
Modern artists
Modern printmakers
Digital artists
Hungarian painters